José Manuel González López (born 14 October 1966) is a Spanish retired footballer who played as a forward, currently a manager.

Playing career
Born in Cádiz, Andalusia, he was known simply as José during his playing days. He finished his youth career with Cádiz CF, making his senior debut with the reserves in the Tercera División. On 9 September 1984 he played his first match as a professional, starting in a 2–0 home win over RC Celta de Vigo in the Segunda División.

José was definitely promoted to the first team in summer 1986, and made his La Liga debut on 2 November of that year by coming on as a late substitute in a 1–0 away loss against RCD Español. He scored his first professional goal on 20 March 1988, his side's third in a 4–1 home rout of Real Betis.

On 17 August 1991, after scoring a career-best seven goals to help his team avoid relegation in the play-offs, José signed a three-year deal with fellow league club RCD Mallorca, for 75 million pesetas. He appeared in only five matches in his first season, which ended in relegation.

After featuring more regularly the following campaign, José joined Albacete Balompié in a return to the top flight. He subsequently represented Rayo Vallecano, Málaga CF and China's Tianjin TEDA FC, retiring with the latter in 1997 at the age of only 30.

Coaching career
González returned to Cádiz in 2001, being named manager of the youth setup. On 24 May 2002, he was appointed at the helm of the first team.

González won promotion from Segunda División B in his first season, and led the side to a seventh-place finish in the second. On 2 June 2004 he signed with another club he had already represented as a player, Albacete. In February of the following year, he was sacked.

On 5 November 2006, González returned to the Estadio Ramón de Carranza, taking the place of Oli. He left at the end of the campaign, and on 1 April 2008 joined Córdoba CF who were seriously threatened with relegation.

González was dismissed on 8 December 2008, and moved to Real Murcia (still in the second tier) on 2 November of the following year. He re-joined Cádiz after suffering relegation, leaving his post in 2012.

González was named Gregorio Manzano's assistant at Beijing Guoan F.C. from the Chinese Super League on 13 February 2014, moving alongside former Cádiz teammate José María Quevedo. On 22 February 2016, he was appointed manager at Spanish top-division Granada CF as a replacement for José Ramón Sandoval.

On 23 November 2016, González returned to Beijing Guoan, now as a head coach. He was dismissed six months later, following a poor run of results.

González moved back to his country in January 2018, taking over from the fired Míchel at Málaga. After only two wins in 19 matches, the side was relegated from the top flight as last.

On 4 January 2020, González returned to China and became the manager of Wuhan Zall FC. The city was in the midst of the coronavirus pandemic, but he pledged to stay with the club. He was relieved of his duties in September, due to a poor run of results.

González was appointed at Dalian Professional F.C. in April 2021. He was dismissed at the end of the season.

Managerial statistics

Notes

References

External links

Stats and bio at Cadistas1910 

1966 births
Living people
Spanish footballers
Footballers from Cádiz
Association football forwards
La Liga players
Segunda División players
Segunda División B players
Tercera División players
Cádiz CF B players
Cádiz CF players
RCD Mallorca players
Albacete Balompié players
Rayo Vallecano players
Málaga CF players
Tianjin Jinmen Tiger F.C. players
Spanish expatriate footballers
Expatriate footballers in China
Spanish expatriate sportspeople in China
Spanish football managers
La Liga managers
Segunda División managers
Segunda División B managers
Cádiz CF managers
Albacete Balompié managers
Córdoba CF managers
Real Murcia managers
Granada CF managers
Chinese Super League managers
Beijing Guoan F.C. managers
Wuhan F.C. managers
Dalian Professional F.C. managers
Spanish expatriate football managers
Expatriate football managers in China
Beijing Guoan F.C. non-playing staff